Krishna Wildlife Sanctuary is a wildlife sanctuary and estuary  located in Andhra Pradesh, India. It is one of the rarest eco-regions of the world because it harbors vast tracts of pristine mangrove forests. It is believed by conservationists to be one of the last remaining tracts of thick primary mangrove forests of South India, which is rapidly disappearing due to absence of protective measures.

Geography

The sanctuary is a part of the mangrove wetland in Andhra Pradesh and are located in the coastal plain of Krishna River delta.
The Krishna mangroves lie between 15° 2' N and 15° 55' N in latitude and 80° 42'- 81° 01' E in longitude spread across Krishna and Guntur districts of Andhra Pradesh.
It includes Sorlagondi Reserve Forest, Nachugunta Reserve Forest, Yelichetladibba Reserve Forest, Kottapalem Reserve Forest, Molagunta Reserve Forest, Adavuladivi Reserve Forest and Lankivanidibba Reserve Forest. They occupy the islands of the delta and the adjacent mainlands of Krishna and Guntur Districts.
A part of the mangroves is located far from the main mangrove area. This unconnected regions lies near Machilipatnam on its eastern side and Nakshatranagar on its western side.

Flora and fauna

Some of the tree species in Krishna Wildlife Sanctuary are:
Casuarina equisetifolia, Pongamia gladra, Calotropis gigantea, Cassia auriculata, Thespesia populnea, Ipomaea biloba, Spinifex squarrosus, Spinifex littoreus, Pongamia pinnate, Prosopis juliflora, banyan, peepul, margosa, tumma, mango, palmyra.

Fishing cats were recorded between November 2013 and August 2014 at several locations outside Krishna Wildlife Sanctuary.

The sanctuary is home to reptiles including the garden lizard, wall lizard and tortoise.

Snakes
Snakes of the area include:

The amphibian fauna present in the sanctuary include the common frog, the otter and the saltwater crocodile.

The herbivorous species present are spotted deer, sambar and black buck.

Other species found in the sanctuary are jungle cat, fox and bear.

Avifauna include crested serpent eagle, Indian roller, wagtails and pipits.

See also
 Wildlife in India

References

External links
 Krishna wildlife sanctuary from Forest Department of Andhra Pradesh (India) State Government website
 Forest Department of Andhra Pradesh (India) State Government website

Wildlife sanctuaries in Andhra Pradesh
Protected areas with year of establishment missing